Choi Kyung-Ja also Choi Kyong-ja is a former international table tennis player from South Korea.

Table tennis career
From 1957 to 1964 she won several medals in singles, doubles, and team events in the Asian Table Tennis Championships. She also won a silver medal in the Corbillon Cup (women's team event) at the 1959 World Table Tennis Championships with Cho Kyung-Cha, Hwang Yool-ja and Lee Chong-Hi.

See also
 List of table tennis players
 List of World Table Tennis Championships medalists

References

South Korean female table tennis players
Year of birth missing (living people)
Asian Games medalists in table tennis
Table tennis players at the 1958 Asian Games
Table tennis players at the 1962 Asian Games
Asian Games silver medalists for South Korea
Asian Games bronze medalists for South Korea
Medalists at the 1958 Asian Games
Medalists at the 1962 Asian Games
Possibly living people
20th-century South Korean women